Elizabeth Cecilia Perry (born 22 November 1987) is a New Zealand former cricketer and hockey player. In cricket, she played as a right-handed batter and right-arm medium bowler. She appeared in 17 One Day Internationals and 31 Twenty20 Internationals for New Zealand. She played domestic cricket for Central Districts, Wellington and Yorkshire. In hockey, she also represented New Zealand internationally.

Perry attended Chanel College, Masterton. She has an honours degree in anthropology and psychology from Canterbury University and works for Global Elite Sports in Sports Recruitment and as a Player Transition Consultant.

In April 2019, Perry married New Zealand cricketer Maddy Green.

References

External links 
 
 

1987 births
Living people
New Zealand women cricketers
New Zealand female field hockey players
New Zealand women One Day International cricketers
New Zealand women Twenty20 International cricketers
People from Taumarunui
People educated at Chanel College, Masterton
Central Districts Hinds cricketers
Wellington Blaze cricketers
Yorkshire women cricketers
New Zealand LGBT sportspeople
LGBT cricketers
Lesbian sportswomen
LGBT field hockey players
Expatriate sportspeople in England
21st-century New Zealand women